Divan Morad may refer to:
 Divan Morad-e Olya